Piteå-Tidningen(or PT) is a regional newspaper published in the Piteå area of Norrbotten County, Sweden. It was founded in 1915.

Piteå-Tidningen AB is owned by the labor movement in the Pite River valley, local unions and individuals. The magazine has a social democratic editorial policy. Its chairman is Lars V. Granberg, and its CEO and editor is Matti Lilja.

Its central editorial office is in Piteå, with a local editorial office in Älvsbyn. Along with Norra Västerbotten newspaper it is co-owner of the news agency Nyheter i Norr ("News in the North"), which also monitors the municipalities of Arvidsjaur and Arjeplog.

The newspaper has a print run of 16,900 copies (2007). For the visually impaired, it also has a talking newspaper edition. It is the largest newspaper in the Pite River valley in competition with the liberal Norra Västerbotten and county newspapers  Norrländska Socialdemokraten and Norrbottens-Kuriren. 

Piteå-Tidningen is also a partner in Norrbottens Media AB, which owns Norrländska Socialdemokraten and Norrbottens-Kuriren. 

Newspapers published in Sweden
Swedish-language newspapers
1915 establishments in Sweden
Publications established in 1915